Evan Jones (born 29 December 1927) is a Jamaican poet, playwright and screenwriter based in Britain. He was educated in Jamaica, the United States and England. Jones taught at schools in the United States before moving to England in 1956 and beginning a career as a writer.

He wrote the scripts for the feature films King and Country, Modesty Blaise, Funeral in Berlin, Wake in Fright, and several television plays.

Biography
Evan Jones was born in 1927 in Portland, Jamaica, the son of a Fred M. Jones, a farmer, and Gladys, a Quaker missionary and teacher. One of seven children, Jones grew up in rural Jamaica and was educated locally, then at the prestigious boarding school Munro College, and subsequently attended Haverford College in Pennsylvania. After Haverford, he went to the Gaza Strip in Palestine in 1949, with the American Friends Service Committee, which organized the refugee camps there under the auspices of the United Nations; his experiences became the basis of his first television screenplay, The Widows of Jaffa. He graduated from Wadham College, Oxford, in 1952 with a BA (Bachelors of Arts Honours) degree in English literature. Jones taught at the George School in Pennsylvania and Wesleyan University, Connecticut. In 1956, he moved to England and earned his living as a writer of documentary drama, television plays and feature films.

His works include the television documentary series The Fight Against Slavery and several films directed by Joseph Losey, including Eva (a collaboration with Hugo Butler, 1962), King and Country (1964) and Modesty Blaise (1966). Other screenplays by Jones include Funeral in Berlin (1966), Escape to Victory (1981) and A Show of Force (1990). He is also notable as the author of Madhouse on Castle Street (1963), a now lost BBC television play, which featured the acting début of Bob Dylan. Jones's poem The Song of the Banana Man (1956) is taught in schools throughout the Caribbean and published in anthologies worldwide. He also wrote biographies, and textbooks and novels for children.

His wife, Joanna Vogel, was an actress and his daughters Melissa and Sadie are both novelists.

The Bodleian Library holds a collection of documents from Jones' life, including drafts of scripts.

Works

Television
The Widows of Jaffa (BBC, 1957)
In a Backward Country, Television Playwright (BBC, 1958)
Madhouse on Castle Street, Sunday-Night Play (BBC, 1963)
Old Man's Fancy, Armchair Theatre (ABC, 1965)
Go Tell It on Table Mountain, Thirty-Minute Theatre (BBC, 1967)
The Fight Against Slavery, miniseries (BBC, 1975)
The Mind Beyond: The Man with the Power, BBC2 Playhouse (BBC, 1976)
Rehearsal, Centre Play (BBC, 1977)
Gambling Lady, The Dick Francis Thriller (Yorkshire Television, 1979)
A Curious Suicide, Chillers (FR3, France, 1990)

Films
Eva (1962)
The Damned (1963)
King and Country (1964)
Modesty Blaise (1966)
Funeral in Berlin (1966)
Two Gentlemen Sharing (1969)
Wake in Fright, also known as Outback (1971)
Ghost in the Noonday Sun (1973)
Night Watch (1973)
Escape to Victory, also known as Victory (1981)
The Killing of Angel Street (1981)
Champions (1984)
Kangaroo (1987)
A Show of Force (1990)
Shadow of the Wolf (1992)

Books
Protector of the Indians, Nelson, 1958
Tales of the Caribbean: Anansi Stories, Ginn, 1984
Tales of the Caribbean: Witches and Duppies, Ginn, 1984
Tales of the Caribbean: The Beginning of Things, Ginn, 1984
Skylarking, Longman, 1993
Stonehaven, Institute of Jamaica Publications, 1993
Alonso and the Drug Barron, Macmillian Caribbean, 2006
A Poem For Every Day of the Year (Allie Esiri, Pan Macmillan, 2017)

Poetry
The Song of the Banana Man (1956)
Lament of the Banana Man (1962)

References

External links

1927 births
People from Portland Parish
British male screenwriters
British television writers
British poets
Jamaican male poets
20th-century Jamaican poets
Wesleyan University faculty
Jamaican dramatists and playwrights
Jamaican male writers
British male poets
British male dramatists and playwrights
British male television writers
living people
People educated at Munro College
Expatriates from the Colony of Jamaica in the United States
Migrants from British Jamaica to the United Kingdom